Pan-Americanism is a movement that seeks to create, encourage, and organize relationships, associations and cooperation among the states of the Americas, through diplomatic, political, economic, and social means.

History
Following the independence of the United States of America in 1776 and the independence of Haiti in 1804, the struggle for independence after 1810 by the nations of Hispanic America evoked a sense of unity, especially in South America, where, under Simón Bolívar in the north and José de San Martín in the south, there were co-operative efforts. Francisco Morazán briefly headed a Federal Republic of Central America. Early South American Pan-Americanists were also inspired by the American Revolutionary War, in which a suppressed and colonized society struggled, united, and gained independence. In the United States, Henry Clay and Thomas Jefferson set forth the principles of Pan-Americanism in the early 19th century, and soon, the United States declared through the Monroe Doctrine a new policy concerning interference by Europe in the affairs of the Americas.

In the 19th century, South American military nationalism came to the fore. Venezuela and Ecuador withdrew in 1830 from Gran Colombia, the Central American Federation collapsed in 1838, Argentina and Brazil fought continually over Uruguay, all three combined in the Paraguayan War (1865–1870) to defeat Paraguay, and Chile defeated Peru and Bolivia in the War of the Pacific (1879–1883). However, during that period, Pan-Americanism existed in the form of a series of Inter-American Conferences—Panama (1826), Lima (1847), Santiago (1856), and Lima (1864). The meetings' main objective was to provide for a common defense. The first of the modern Pan-American Conferences was held in Washington, DC (1889–1890), with all nations represented except the Dominican Republic. Treaties for arbitration of disputes and adjustment of tariffs were adopted, and the Commercial Bureau of the American Republics, which later became the Pan-American Union, was established. Subsequent meetings were held in various South American cities.

In the 20th century, US President Franklin Roosevelt embraced a robust formulation of Pan-Americanism during World War II through the establishment of the Office of the Coordinator of Inter-American Affairs. Following his Good Neighbor Policy, Roosevelt endeavored to foster the development of peaceful commercial and cultural relations between the American Republics through the skillful use of cultural diplomacy.

Evolution

The intended liberalization of commercial intercourse did not occur, but collaboration was extended to a series of areas, such as health (Pan-American Health Organization), geography and history (Pan-American Institute of Geography and History), child protection and children's rights (International American Institute for the Protection of Children), rights of the woman (Inter-American Commission of Women), indigenous policies (Inter-American Indigenist Institute), agriculture (Inter-American Institute of Agricultural Sciences) collective continental defense (Inter-American Treaty of Reciprocal Attendance), economic aid (Inter-American Development Bank), human rights (Inter-American Court of Human Rights), infrastructure works (Pan-American Highway) and peacekeeping (Inter-American Peace Force).

The American states also adopted a series of diplomatic and political rules, which were not always respected or fulfilled, governing relations between the countries like arbitration of disputes, peaceful resolution of conflicts, military non-intervention, equality among the member states of each organism, and in their mutual relations, decisions through resolutions approved by the majority, the recognition of diplomatic asylum, the Private International Law Code (Bustamante Code), the inter-American system of human rights (American Declaration of the Rights and Duties of Man; Inter-American Commission on Human Rights, along with its protocols and associate conventions; and the Inter-American Democratic Charter of the Organization of American States).

Economic Impacts
In 2019, 15.1 and 14.6 percent of all US imports were exchanged with Canada and Mexico, respectively. A significant portion of these imports involved food products. At 76%, the vast majority of all Canadian exports in 2021 were shipped South into the United States. Of these exports, goods such as lumber, automotive and aircraft components, aluminum, wheat, and vegetable oils were among the top exported commodities. Similarly, 76.4% of all Mexican exports, such as computers, cars, and crude petroleum, were destined for the United States. In 2017, 12 and 10 percent of all US exports were exchanged with Canada and Mexico, respectively.

Congresses and conferences
 1826 in Panama. Congreso Anfictiónico de Panamá Congress of Panama. Organized by Simón Bolívar.
 1847–1848 Congreso de Lima
 1856–1857 Congreso de Santiago
 1864-1864 Congreso de Lima
 1889/90 in Washington D.C. International Conference of American States. The day of this meeting, 14 April, has been celebrated since 1930 as Pan American Day.
 1901/02 in Mexico City
 1906 in Rio de Janeiro
 1910 in Buenos Aires
 1922 in Baltimore, Maryland Pan-American Conference of Women.
 1923 in Santiago, Chile
 1928 in Havana
 1933 in Montevideo
 1936 in Buenos Aires (Peace Conference)
 1938 in Lima
 1942 in Rio de Janeiro (conference of Ministers of Foreign Affairs)
 1948 in Bogotá
 1949 founded Office of Latin American Education, which became the Organization of Ibero-American States
 1954 in Caracas
 2nd Latin American Congress of Education took place in Quito
 1967 Buenos Aires
 1969 Viña del Mar
 2005 Panama City, Panama – Congreso de Escritores y Escritoras de Centroamérica to create the Federación Centroamericana. Sponsored by the Asociación de Escritores de Panamá.
 2006 Panama City, Panama – Sponsored by the President of Panama, Martín Torrijos – Latin American and Caribbean Congress in Solidarity with Puerto Rico’s Independence

See also
Latin America
List of conflicts in the Americas
North American Union
2008 South American diplomatic crisis
Panhispanism
Patria Grande

References

Further reading
Aguilar, Alonzo. "Pan-Americanism from Monroe to the Present," Monthly Review Press, New York." (1968).
Aken, Mark J. van. Pan-Hispanism: Its Origin and Development to 1866. Berkeley and Los Angeles: University of California Press 1959.
Bryne, A. (2019). "The Potential of Flight: U.S. Aviation and Pan-Americanism During the Early Twentieth Century." The Journal of the Gilded Age and Progressive Era.

 A study of Pan-Americanism as an idea and of how time has destroyed much of the buttressing hemispheric relations.

 
Americans